Zhu Zhenzhen (born 15 August 1989) is a Chinese wheelchair tennis player. She became the first Chinese wheelchair tennis player to compete at a major at the 2020 Australian Open, where she reached the singles semifinals by defeating the defending champion and world No. 1 Diede de Groot.

Zhu contracted osteomyelitis when she was two years old. She started playing wheelchair tennis in 2005 aged 16.

References

1989 births
Living people
People from Liaocheng
Chinese female tennis players
Paralympic wheelchair tennis players of China
Wheelchair tennis players at the 2016 Summer Paralympics
21st-century Chinese women